Odell  may refer to:

Places

United States
 Odell Township, Livingston County, Illinois
 Odell, Illinois, a village
 Odell, Indiana, an unincorporated community
 Odell, Nebraska, a village
 Odell, New Hampshire, a township
 Odell Hill, New York, a summit
 Odell, Oregon, an unincorporated community and census-designated place
 Odell Lake (Oregon)
 Odell, Texas, an unincorporated community

Elsewhere
 Odell, Bedfordshire, England, a village and civil parish
 25234 Odell, an asteroid

Businesses
 Odell Brewing Company, an independent craft brewery in Fort Collins, Colorado
 Odell's, a supplier of popcorn toppings headquartered in Reno, Nevada

People
 Odell (surname)
 Odell (given name)

See also
 Odell Town, West Virginia, an unincorporated community
 Odell Building, Morrison, Illinois, on the National Register of Historic Places
 Odel, metal company
 O'Dell (disambiguation)